François Gonon (born 23 April 1979) is a French orienteering competitor. He has received gold and silver medals with the French relay team in both world championships and European championships. He currently competes for the French orienteering club O'JURA and for the Swedish orienteering club IFK Göteborg.

Biography
He competed at the 2005 World Orienteering Championships in  Aichi, where he received a silver medal in relay with the French team. He received a silver medal in the relay event at the 2006 European Orienteering Championships in  Otepää, together with Damien Renard and Thierry Gueorgiou. He finished 6th overall in the Orienteering World Cup in 2007. He received a bronze medal in the long distance event at the 2008 World Orienteering Championships in Olomouc. He received a gold medal in the relay event and a bronze medal in the long distance event at the 2011 World Orienteering Championships in Savoie.

References

External links

1979 births
Living people
French orienteers
Male orienteers
Foot orienteers
World Orienteering Championships medalists
French sky runners
Competitors at the 2001 World Games
Competitors at the 2005 World Games
Junior World Orienteering Championships medalists